Toshihisa is a masculine Japanese given name.

Possible writings
Toshihisa can be written using different combinations of kanji characters. Some examples: 

敏久, "agile, long time"
敏尚, "agile, still"
俊久, "talented, long time"
俊尚, "talented, still"
利久, "benefit, long time"
利尚, "benefit, still"
年久, "year, long time"
年尚, "year, still"
寿久, "long life, long time"
寿尚, "long life, still"
歳久, "age, long time"

The name can also be written in hiragana としひさ or katakana トシヒサ.

Notable people with the name
Toshihisa Kuzuhara (葛原 稔永, born 1980), Japanese motorcycle racer.
Toshihisa Nagata (長田 利久, born 1945), Japanese bobsledder.
Toshihisa Nanbu (南部 利剛, 1827–1896), Japanese daimyō.
Toshihisa Nishi (仁志 敏久, born 1971), Japanese baseball player.
Toshihisa Shimazu (島津 歳久, 1537–1592), Japanese samurai.
Toshihisa Toyoda (豊田 利久, born 1940), Japanese economist.
Toshihisa Tsuchihashi (土橋 登志久, born 1966), Japanese tennis player.

Japanese masculine given names